John Rosevear (died May 5, 1881) was an Ontario political figure. He represented Durham East in the Legislative Assembly of Ontario from 1875 to 1881 as a Conservative member.

He served as reeve for Port Hope and was a major in the local militia. He died in office in 1881.

External links 
The Canadian parliamentary companion and annual register, 1878, CH Mackintosh
Member's parliamentary history for the Legislative Assembly of Ontario

Year of birth missing
1881 deaths
Progressive Conservative Party of Ontario MPPs